Abdul Rahman Lestaluhu (born 23 August 1993) is an Indonesian former footballer who plays as a winger.

Club career 
He was signed by Persebaya from Visé in November 2013. Before Visé, he was part of Peñarol squad but did not made an appearance.

In December 2014, he signed with Persija.

Honours

Club 
Semen Padang
 Liga 2 runner-up: 2018

References

External links 
 

1993 births
Living people
Sportspeople from Maluku (province)
Indonesian footballers
Badak Lampung F.C. players
Bhayangkara F.C. players
Semen Padang F.C. players
Indonesian expatriate footballers
Expatriate footballers in Belgium
Indonesian expatriate sportspeople in Belgium
Challenger Pro League players
C.S. Visé players
Liga 1 (Indonesia) players
Persija Jakarta players
Association football wingers
21st-century Indonesian people